Mambai may refer to:

 Mambai people, a people group also known as Mambae, Manbae or Maubere from Timor-Leste
 Mambai language (Timor), the language spoken by Mambai people from Timor-Leste
 Mambai language (Cameroon), a language also known as Mangbai or Mamgbay language from northern Cameroon and southern Chad

See also
 Mumbai (disambiguation)

Language and nationality disambiguation pages